Hadnall is a civil parish in the district of Telford and Wrekin, Shropshire, England.  It contains twelve listed buildings that are recorded in the National Heritage List for England.  Of these, one is at Grade II*, the middle of the three grades, and the others are at Grade II, the lowest grade.  The parish contains the village of Hadnall and the surrounding countryside.  The listed buildings consist of houses and farmhouses with associated structures, a church, a windmill converted into a house, the lodge to a former mansion, a public house, and a charnel house.


Key

Buildings

References

Citations

Sources

Lists of buildings and structures in Shropshire